Helena Lewczynska (born 13 February 1992) is a badminton player from England. She started playing badminton at age 7, and won a silver medal at the 2011 European Junior Badminton Championships in the mixed doubles event. She studied Geography Bsc at the University of Leeds.

Achievements

European Junior Badminton Championships
Mixed doubles

BWF International Challenge/Series
Women's doubles

 BWF International Challenge tournament
 BWF International Series tournament
 BWF Future Series tournament

References

External links
 

1992 births
Living people
People from Radlett
English female badminton players